The 1996 Ukrainian miner protests was a series of miner strikes throughout eastern Ukraine, mainly Donbas, in 1996 led by 800,000 men, who demonstrated against mining conditions and refused to load coal. Coal miners was the main majority, however other groups of miners and workers joined the movement in February 1996. Strikes were pulled out for 1 day as a 24-hour strike in protest, however, sporadic protests occurred throughout the east of the country while venting their anger at budgetary chaos.

See also
 2020 Ukrainian miner protests

References

Protests in Ukraine
1996 protests